General elections were held in Italy on 16 November 1919. The fragmented Liberal governing coalition lost the absolute majority in the Chamber of Deputies, due to the success of the Italian Socialist Party and the Italian People's Party.

Background
The elections took place in the middle of Biennio Rosso ("Red Biennium") a two-year period, between 1919 and 1920, of intense social conflict in Italy, following the First World War. The revolutionary period was followed by the violent reaction of the Fascist blackshirts militia and eventually by the March on Rome of Benito Mussolini in 1922.

The Biennio Rosso took place in a context of economic crisis at the end of the war, with high unemployment and political instability. It was characterized by mass strikes, worker manifestations as well as self-management experiments through land and factories occupations. In Turin and Milan, workers councils were formed and many factory occupations took place under the leadership of anarcho-syndicalists. The agitations also extended to the agricultural areas of the Padan plain and were accompanied by peasant strikes, rural unrests and guerrilla conflicts between left-wing and right-wing militias.

In the general election, the fragmented Liberal governing coalition lost the absolute majority in the Chamber of Deputies, due to the success of the Italian Socialist Party and the Italian People's Party. The Socialists of Nicola Bombacci received the most votes in almost every region and especially in Emilia-Romagna (60.0%), Piedmont (49.7%), Lombardy (45.9%), Tuscany (41.7%) and Umbria (46.5%), while the People's Party were the largest party in Veneto (42.6%) and came second in Lombardy (30.1%) and the Liberal lists were stronger in Southern Italy (over 50% in Abruzzo, Campania, Basilicata, Apulia, Calabria and Sicily).

Electoral system 
The old system of using single-member constituencies with two-round majority voting was abolished and replaced with proportional representation in 58 constituencies with between 5 and 20 members.

Parties and leaders

Voter turnout

Results

Leading parties by region

References

General elections in Italy
Italy
General
Italy